The events of 1969 in anime.

Releases

See also
1969 in animation

External links 
Japanese animated works of the year, listed in the IMDb

Anime
Anime
Years in anime
1969 anime